Quintus Marcius Tremulus was a Roman plebeian magistrate. He was first elected in 306 BC with Publius Cornelius Arvina.  In his first consulate Tremulus led wars, which were won with ease, against the Hernici and Anagni.  When Tremulus returned to Rome an equestrian statue dedicated to him was erected in front of the Temple of Castor.

He was elected consul in 288, again with the same colleague Publius Cornelius Cossus Arvina.

He was likely the father of Quintus Marcius Philippus.

References

4th-century BC Roman consuls
3rd-century BC Roman consuls
Tremulus, Quintus